Andover College in South Portland, Maine began as the Andover Institute of Business in Portland in 1967; the name was changed to Andover College in 1977. The college was given accreditation from the New England Association of Schools and Colleges (NEASC) in 1998.

History 
Andover College also had a campus in Lewiston, started in 2004. The college was bought by the Kaplan Higher Education Corporation (KHE) in 2005Tice, Lindsay (4 February 2005). Andover College sold to Kaplan, Sun Journal (Lewiston, Maine) and joined the Kaplan Higher Education Campuses (KHEC) division.  In 2010 the name was changed to Kaplan University, South Portland Campus.

Notable alumni
Mark Bryant (1983), Maine state legislator

References

External links
Andover College - Lewiston Campus
Andover College - South Portland Campus

Universities and colleges in Portland, Maine
Universities and colleges in Androscoggin County, Maine
Education in South Portland, Maine
Universities and colleges in Cumberland County, Maine